Etta Deikman is an American artist whose works embrace abstract art. She was born in New York and currently lives and works in Mill Valley, California.

Life and work
Etta Deikman studied with both Hans Hoffman and Willem de Kooning.  She is a graduate of Black Mountain College, and attended contemporaneously with Merce Cunningham and John Cage. Reviews of her work include these statements:

“Deikman’s bold colorful works soar upwards without a care for Isaac Newton’s apples. Although Deikman studied with both Hans Hoffman and Willem de Kooning, her sometimes slapdash, sometimes geometric compositions more often recall Kandinsky’s sudden shifts from chaos to control, and back again. ” – Artweek Magazine, April 1999

“Deikman takes painting seriously and you better believe it. She is invested in every line, but there is also constant play between the line and the background… and it is in this interplay that Deikman has developed a syntax of her own.”  –Tyson Underwood, Pacific Sun 1995

Her career began in the 1950s and she has been exhibiting and selling her work ever since. She has received a number of grants for her work including from the Mann Arts Council for the San Francisco Foundation.

Her work is better known in California, yet a number of her works are part of private collections on the East Coast.  Photographs and reviews of her work have appeared in (among numerous others) Artweek Magazine  on several occasions, Pacific Sun (1/18/95, 6/83, 7/21/78), and earlier in her career in The New York Times (5/4/61) and The Washington Post (2/1959 and 4/1959).

Etta was married to psychiatrist and author Dr. Arthur Deikman until his death in 2013.

References

American abstract artists
Artists from California
Artists from New York (state)
American women artists
Year of birth missing (living people)
Living people
Place of birth missing (living people)
People from Mill Valley, California
21st-century American women